Slide Hampton and His Horn of Plenty (titled Slide! on the back cover) is the debut album by American jazz trombonist, composer and arranger Slide Hampton which was released on the Strand label in 1961.

Reception

Allmusic stated: "The hard bop music is ably interpreted by the medium-size group, which was overflowing with young talent".

Track listing 
All compositions by Slide Hampton, except as indicated.
 "Newport" - 9:10
 "Autumn Leaves" (Joseph Kosma, Jacques Prevert, Johnny Mercer) - 3:24
 "Althea" - 4:01
 "Jazz Corner" - 4:22
 "Sometimes I Feel Like a Motherless Child" (Traditional) - 3:00
 "Go East, Young Man" - 5:54
 "Patricia" - 3:42
 "Woody 'n' You" (Dizzy Gillespie) - 4:10

Personnel 
Slide Hampton - trombone, arranger
Burt Collins, Freddie Hubbard, Booker Little - trumpet
Kiane Zawadi - euphonium
George Coleman - tenor saxophone
Jay Cameron - baritone saxophone
George Tucker - bass
Kenny Dennis (tracks 3 & 8), Pete La Roca (tracks 1 & 4-6), Charli Persip (tracks 2 & 7) - drums

References 

Slide Hampton albums
1959 albums